Charles of Durazzo ( 1323 – 23 January 1348) was a Neapolitan nobleman, the eldest son of John, Duke of Durazzo and Agnes of Périgord.

Life

He succeeded his father as Duke of Durazzo and Count of Gravina in 1336.

On 21 April 1343, he married Maria of Calabria, Countess of Alba, in Naples. She was the younger daughter of Charles, Duke of Calabria and sister of Joan I of Naples, and had been intended as a bride for Louis I of Hungary or John II of France, but was abducted by Charles and his mother to make a marriage that would place Charles closer to the throne of Naples.

Keeping carefully aloof from the conspiracy that murdered Joan's husband Andrew, Duke of Calabria, he led a faction opposing Joan and Louis of Taranto. He contacted the Hungarian court, seeking their support. He hoped to turn the invasion of Louis of Hungary and the flight of Joan to his own ends: but he was seized and beheaded by the Hungarians at Aversa.

Issue

Charles and Maria had:

 Louis (December 1343 – 14 January 1344)
 Joanna (1344–1387), Duchess of Durazzo; married first in 1366 Louis of Navarre, Count of Beaumont (d. 1372), married second Robert IV of Artois, Count of Eu (d. 1387)
 Agnes (1345–1383, Naples), married first on 6 June 1363 Cansignorio della Scala, Lord of Verona (d. 1375), married second James of Baux (d. 1383)
 Clementia (1346–1363, Naples)
 Margaret (28 July 1347 – 6 August 1412), married in February 1368 Charles III of Naples

References

Sources

 

1323 births
1348 deaths
House of Anjou-Durazzo
Dukes of Durazzo
Counts of Gravina